Charles E. Johnston (October 30, 1881 – July 10, 1951) was the eighth president of Kansas City Southern Railway.

References
 Kansas City Southern Historical Society, The Kansas City Southern Lines. Retrieved August 15, 2005.

1881 births
1951 deaths
20th-century American railroad executives
Kansas City Southern Railway